Isaac Thomas Hecker (December 18, 1819 – December 22, 1888) was an American Catholic priest and founder of the Paulist Fathers, a North American religious society of men.

Hecker was originally ordained a Redemptorist priest in 1849. With the blessing of Pope Pius IX, he founded the Missionary Society of St. Paul the Apostle, now known as the Paulist Fathers, in New York on July 7, 1858. The Society was established to evangelize both believers and non-believers to convert America to the Catholic Church. Hecker sought to evangelize Americans using the popular means of his day, primarily preaching, the public lecture circuit, and the printing press. One of his more enduring publications is The Catholic World, which he created in 1865.

Hecker's spirituality mainly centered on cultivating the action of the Holy Spirit within the soul as well as the necessity of being attuned to how the Lord prompts one in great and small moments in life. Hecker believed that the Catholic faith and American political culture of small government, property rights, civil society and liberal democracy were not opposed but could be reconciled. The ideas of individual freedom, community, service, and authority were fundamental to Hecker when conceiving how the Paulists would be governed and administered.

Hecker was a friend and colleague of classic liberal thinker Lord Acton in the cause of liberal Catholicism—opposed to ultramontanism politics in the church. Hecker's work was likened to that of Cardinal John Henry Newman, by the Cardinal himself. In a letter written to Augustine Hewit on the occasion of Hecker's death, Newman wrote: "I have ever felt that there was a sort of unity in our lives, that we had both begun a work of the same kind, he in America and I in England."

Hecker's cause for sainthood was opened January 25, 2008, in the mother church of the Paulist Fathers on 59th St, New York City. He was thereafter named a Servant of God.

Early life
Isaac Hecker was born in New York City on December 18, 1819, the third son and youngest child of German immigrants, John and Caroline (Freund) Hecker. When barely twelve years of age, he had to go to work and pushed a baker's cart for his elder brothers who had a bakery on Rutgers Street. He studied at every possible opportunity, becoming immersed in Kant's Critique of Pure Reason, and while still, a lad took part in certain politico-social movements which aimed at the elevation of the working man.

Brook Farm movement
It was at this juncture that he met Orestes Brownson, who exercised a marked influence over him. Isaac was deeply religious, a characteristic for which he gave much credit to his prayerful mother, and remained so amid all the reading and agitating in which he engaged. Having grown into young manhood, he joined the Brook Farm movement, and in that colony, he tarried some six months.

Conversion to Catholicism and ordination as a priest

Shortly after leaving the Brook Farm in 1844, Hecker was baptized into the Roman Catholic Church by Bishop John McCloskey of New York. One year later, he was entered in the novitiate of the Redemptorists in Belgium, and there he cultivated to a high degree the spirit of lofty mystical piety which marked him through life.

Ordained a priest in London by then Bishop Nicholas Wiseman in 1849, he spent a year as a parish priest and chaplain with the small Redemptorist community at Our Immaculate Lady of Victories in Clapham. He returned to New York in March 1851 and worked until 1857 as a Redemptorist missionary. With all his mysticism, Isaac Hecker had the wide-awake mind of the typical American. He perceived that the Catholic Church's missionary activity in the United States must remain to a large extent ineffective unless it adopted methods suited to the country and the age. In this, he had the sympathy of four fellow Redemptorists, who like himself were of American birth and converts from Protestantism.

Acting as their agent, and with his local superiors' consent, Hecker went to Rome to beg of the Rector Major of his Order that a Redemptorist novitiate might be opened in the United States, in order thus to attract American youths to the missionary life. In furtherance of this request, he took with him the strong approval of some American hierarchy members. The Rector Major, instead of listening to Hecker, expelled him from the Order for having made the journey to Rome without sufficient authorization.

Isaac, determined to fight the expulsion, remained in Rome. He approached Cardinal Alessandro Barnabò, prefect of the Propaganda, the Congregation of the Roman Curia with supervisory responsibility for the church in the United States. Cardinal Barnabo, made aware by American bishops of Hecker's outstanding missionary work and personal holiness, arranged an interview with Pope Pius IX. The pontiff dispensed Hecker and his four companions from their vows as Redemptorists.

Founding of the Paulist Fathers
During his months in Rome, Isaac had determined that the best way to serve the church in the United States was to establish a congregation of priests to labor for the conversion of his native land. Pope Pius approved his plan and encouraged him to take the steps necessary for its realization. "To me, the future looks bright, hopeful, full of promise," he wrote home, "and I feel confident in God's providence and assured of his grace in our regard."

The outcome was that Hecker, George Deshon, Augustine Hewit, Francis Baker, and Clarence Walworth, all of whom were American Redemptorists, were permitted by Pope Pius IX in 1858 to form the separate religious community of the Paulists.

Hecker returned to America from Rome and gathered his American friends Hewit, Baker, and Deshon to plan their congregation. Archbishop John Hughes accepted the men into his New York archdiocese, giving them a parish on 59th Street for their home. The five men decided on calling themselves the "Missionary Priests of St. Paul the Apostle." The priests, popularly known as the Paulists, conducted parish missions and retreats for non-Catholics.

Between 1867 and 1869, Hecker, directly addressing Protestants from lecture platforms, delivered more than 56 lecture series, traveling from Boston to Missouri, from Chicago to Hartford. During one Western tour, he traveled more than 4,500 miles and spoke to more than 30,000 people, two-thirds of whom were non-Catholics. Hecker's first biographer, Walter Elliot, wrote: "We can never forget how distinctly American was the impression of his personality. We heard the nation's greatest men then living. ...Father Hecker was so plainly a great man of this type, so evidently an outgrowth of our institutions, that he stamped American on every Catholic argument he proposed. ...Never was a man a more Catholic than Father Hecker, simply, calmly, joyfully, entirely Catholic." Another writer quipped, "He is putting American machinery into the ancient ark and is getting ready to run her by steam."

In April 1865, adding the written word to his speaking campaign, Isaac launched The Catholic World, a monthly magazine. A year later, he founded the Catholic Publication Society (now the Paulist Press) to disseminate Catholic doctrine on a large scale, primarily for non-Catholics. In 1870, he established The Young Catholic, a magazine for young boys and girls.

In 1869-70, Hecker attended the First Vatican Council as a theologian for Bishop James Gibbons of North Carolina. On the trip, he visited Assisi, home of Francis of Assisi. "Francis touched the chords of feeling and aspiration of the hearts of his time and organized them for united action," Hecker wrote in his journal.

Returning home in June 1870, the 55-year-old Hecker, full of enthusiasm, looked forward to resuming his American apostolate. But instead, he was stricken with painful, chronic leukemia. So rapidly did the disease progress that by 1871, he could not continue his work as Paulist director, pastor, lecturer, and writer. Hecker had great difficulty accepting that the God he served would allow him to be cut down in mid-career. When he left for Europe to seek a cure, he told his Paulist brothers: "Look upon me as a dead man. ...God is trying me severely in soul and body, and I must have the courage to suffer crucifixion." He wandered from one European spa to another, worn in body and sorely tried in spirit, struggling to believe that God was as much at work in him now as he was on the lecture platform.

He spent the winter of 1873-74 aboard a boat on the Nile River; the sail benefited him immensely. "This trip," he wrote, "has been in every respect much more to my benefit than my most sanguine expectations led me to hope. It seems to me almost like an inspiration."

In 1875, the American Paulists invited Hecker to return to their midst. He came back and started to work once more, although on a limited basis. For 13 more years, he exerted his constantly diminishing strength to bring Catholicism to the hearts of his fellow Americans. During these declining years, he also expanded his vision to the entire world, mainly Europe, where the prestige of the Roman Catholic Church was in decline. At the First Vatican Council, in an attempt to stem this decline, the church issued the doctrine of papal infallibility. Following the Council, Hecker wrote an essay describing the work of the Holy Spirit in the renewal of both church and state. Hecker's theology foreshadowed by 80 years the interest of the Second Vatican Council in the role of the Holy Spirit.

During his last years, Hecker always struggled with the feeling that God had abandoned him and that his life was useless. But, as the terrible blood cancer destroyed his body, his spirit found new strength. He turned back the despair; he accepted his lot as God's will for him. The spirit within him brought him new peace and serenity. Isaac Hecker died December 22, 1888, at the Paulist House on 59th Street in Manhattan.

Hecker and Americanism

The name of Hecker is closely associated with Americanism. As part of this controversy, Hecker was accused by the French cleric Charles Maignen (article in French) of subjectivism and crypto-Protestantism. During the French Third Republic (which began in 1870), the power and influence of French Catholicism steadily declined. The French government passed laws bearing more and more stringently on the church, and most French citizens did not object. Indeed, they began to look toward legislators and not to the clergy for guidance.

Observing this and encouraged by the action of Pope Leo XIII, who in 1892 called on French Catholics loyally to accept the Republic, several young French priests determined that because the church had held itself aloof from modern philosophies and practices, people had turned away from it. They also noted that Catholicism was not making much use of modern means of propaganda, such as social movements or the organization of clubs. In short, the church had not adapted to modern needs. They agitated for social and philanthropic projects, a closer relationship between priests and parishioners, and general cultivation of personal initiative, both in clergy and laity. Not unnaturally, they looked for inspiration to America.

The French reformers took him as a kind of patron saint. His biography, written in English by Paulist priest Walter Elliott in 1891, was translated into French six years later. A long introduction by a liberal French priest made exaggerated claims for Hecker. Trends in liberal Catholic thought in Europe became associated with the church in the United States and particularly with Hecker. Inspired by Hecker's life and character, the activist French priests undertook the task of persuading their fellow-priests to accept the political system, and then to break out of their isolation, put themselves in touch with the intellectual life of the country, and take an active part in the work of social amelioration. In 1897 the movement received an impetus O'Connell, former Rector of the Pontifical North American College in Rome, spoke on behalf of Hecker's ideas at the Catholic Congress in Friburg.

Conservative Catholics took alarm at what they considered to be symptoms of pernicious modernism or Liberalism. They thought the "Allons au peuple" catchphrase had a ring of heresy, breaking down the divinely established distinction between the priest and the layman and giving lay people too much power in church affairs. The insistence upon individual initiative was judged to be incompatible with the fundamentals of Catholicism. Moreover, the conservatives were, almost to a man, anti-republicans who distrusted and disliked the democratic abbés (clergy). It was for this reason that Hecker acquired the reputation of being called "The Yellow Dart." The conservatives complained to the Pope, and in 1898 Abbé Charles Maignen wrote a violent polemic against the new movement called Le Père Hecker, est-il un saint? ("Is Father Hecker a Saint?").

Many powerful Vatican authorities also detested the Americanist tendency. However, Pope Leo XIII was reluctant to chastise the American Catholics, whom he had often praised for their loyalty and faith. But he eventually made concessions to the pressures upon him, and in early February 1899 addressed to Cardinal James Gibbons the papal brief Testem Benevolentiae. This document condemned the following doctrines or tendencies:
 undue insistence on interior initiative in the spiritual life, as leading to disobedience,
 attacks on religious vows, and disparagement of the value of religious orders in the modern world,
 minimizing Catholic doctrine,
 minimizing the importance of spiritual direction.
The brief did not assert that Hecker and the Americans had held any unsound doctrine on the above points. Instead, it merely stated that if such opinions did exist, the Pope called upon the hierarchy to eradicate them. Cardinal Gibbons and many other prelates replied to Rome. With a near-unanimous voice, they declared that the incriminated opinions had no existence among American Catholics. Hecker had never countenanced the slightest departure from Catholic principles in their fullest and most strict application. The disturbance caused by the condemnation was slight; almost the entire laity and a considerable part of the clergy were unaware of this affair. However, the pope's brief did end up strengthening the position of the conservatives in France.

When the church in America was struggling with the question of whether the assimilation of Catholics, many of whom were immigrants, into American culture would compromise their Catholic faith, Hecker saw no contradiction between being American and being Catholic. According to Russell Shaw, "On the level of ideas, no one before or since has done more than Isaac Hecker did to promote Catholic assimilation into the secular culture of the United States."

Cause for sainthood
Cardinal Edward Egan of New York formally opened Hecker's cause for sainthood on January 25, 2008, at St. Paul the Apostle Catholic Church in New York City, mother church of the Paulist Fathers, at which time Hecker was given the title Servant of God.

Quotes
 "Religion is the answer to that cry of reason which nothing can silence, that aspiration of the soul which no created thing can meet, that want of the heart which all creation cannot supply."
 " … You say you have no time to pray! Have you time to breathe? Prayer is to the life of the soul as breathing is to the life of the body. It is absurd to say you do not have the time to pray, as it would be to say that you have no time to breathe. Pray when you rise and dress, pray when you are on the way to work, or to your place of business, or on your return home or before you go to bed. Lift up your hearts to God at intervals during the day. These short aspirations of the soul are like swift arrows which pierce the clouds and penetrate to the very throne of God. … "("The Battle of Life" sermon preached at the Church of St. Paul the Apostle in New York City, 1865)

Works
 Questions of the Soul
 Aspirations of Nature

See also
 Institutes of consecrated life

Notes

References
Attribution

Sources
 Behnke, John J. Isaac Thomas Becker: Spiritual Pilgrim. New York: Paulist Press.
 Farina, John. An American Experience of God. New York: Paulist Press, 1981.
 Farina, John, ed. Isaac Hecker. The Early Diary: Romantic Religion in Ante-bellum America. New York: Paulist Press, 1989.
 Farina, John. Hecker Studies: Essays on the Thought of Isaac Hecker. New York: Paulist Press, 1983.
 Hecker, Isaac. The Paulist Vocation. New York: Paulist Press, 2000.
 Holden, Vincent F. Yankee Paul: Isaac Thomas Hecker. Milwaukee: Bruce Pub. Co, 1958.
 Hostetter, Larry. The Ecclesial Dimension of Personal and Social Reform in the Writings of Isaac Thomas Hecker. Roman Catholic Studies 15. Lewistone, NY: Edwin Mellen Press, 2001.
 O'Brien, David J. Isaac Hecker: An American Catholic. New York: Paulist Press, 1992.
 McSorley, Joseph. Isaac Hecker and his Friends. New York: Paulist Press, 1972.
 Robichaud, Paul. A Future Brighter Than Any Past. New York: Paulist Press. 2017.

External links
 by Walter Elliott (see also createspace.com)
 
 
 The Brownson-Hecker Correspondence, Notre Dame studies in American Catholicism, Number 1 (1979).

1819 births
1888 deaths
19th-century American Roman Catholic priests
19th-century venerated Christians
American people of German descent
American Servants of God
Converts to Roman Catholicism from Methodism
Liberal Catholicism
People from New York City
People of the Roman Catholic Archdiocese of New York